Johannes Stössel  (8 May 1837, in Bäretswil – 7 November 1919) was a Swiss politician and President of the Swiss National Council (1884/1885).

Further reading

External links 
 
 

1837 births
1919 deaths
People from Hinwil District
Swiss Calvinist and Reformed Christians
Free Democratic Party of Switzerland politicians
Members of the National Council (Switzerland)
Presidents of the National Council (Switzerland)
Members of the Council of States (Switzerland)